The northern mealy amazon or northern mealy parrot (Amazona guatemalae) is among the largest parrots in the genus Amazona, the amazon parrots. It is endemic to tropical Central America. This species and the southern mealy amazon (Amazona farinosa) were previously considered conspecific. Some taxonomic authorities (including the American Ornithological Society, continue to lump them together.

Taxonomy
Philip Sclater described the northern mealy amazon in 1860. Two subspecies have been described and these have alternative common names that are used frequently in aviculture:

 A. g. guatemalae: Found from southeastern Mexico to Honduras. Also known as the blue-crowned mealy amazon or the Guatemalan amazon.
 A. g. virenticeps: Found in Nicaragua to western Panama. Also known as the Costa Rican mealy amazon or the green-headed amazon.

Description

It has a relatively short and squarish tail, as do the other members of the Amazona genus.

The northern mealy amazon is mainly green. The back and nape often have a whitish tinge; almost as if it had been covered in a thin layer of flour ("meal"; hence its name). The distal half of the tail is paler and more yellow than the basal half, thus resulting in a distinctly bi-colored look. In flight it shows a bluish-black trailing edge to the wing and a conspicuous red speculum. Occasionally a few yellow feathers are apparent on the top of the head and it has a bluish-tinged crown. The maroon to orange eyes (which typically appear dark from a distance) are surrounded by a relatively broad white eye-ring of bare skin.

Distribution and habitat
The northern mealy amazon occurs in tropical Central America. It frequents humid to semi-humid forest (only rarely in deciduous forest) and plantations. In regions dominated by open/dry habitats it is restricted to gallery forest or completely absent.

Behavior
The northern mealy amazon is social and can be found in pairs or in large flocks. They are even known to interact with other parrots, such as macaws. They are usually quiet but can be loud at dusk and dawn.

Diet
The diet of the northern mealy amazon consists mostly of fruits, seeds, berries, nuts, blossoms, and leaf buds.

Breeding
After northern mealy amazons reach sexual maturity they usually form monogamous relationships with a single partner. Each year courtship usually begins in early spring, and the female will usually lay three or four white eggs in a tree-cavity nest. The female incubates the eggs for about 26 days. The male regurgitates food for the female during the incubation period, and later for the chicks in the nest as well. The chicks leave the nest about 60 days after hatching.

Status and conservation
It is fairly common in most of its range, but has declined locally due to habitat loss and trapping for the wild parrot trade. Trafficking of the birds (as for exotic pets) is illegal in many nations, but the species are still smuggled into the United States from Mexico. The northern mealy amazon sometimes feeds on human crops (especially corn) and may be considered a crop pest.

References

Sholty, Kathleen. "Amazona farinosa (mealy parrot)." Animal Diversity Web. University of Michigan Museum of Zoology. 2006. 
 A Guide to the Parrots of the World by Juniper & Parr (1998) 
 A Guide to Birds of Mexico and Northern Central America by Howell & Webb (1995) 

northern mealy amazon
Birds of Central America
northern mealy amazon
northern mealy amazon